Abutilon pannosum is a subshrub species of the family Malvaceae. It is a perennial shrub that grows up to 10 feet tall.

Morphology 
Velvety, cordate base shaped leaves, with wooly appearance at the lower surfaces while the upper surface are somewhat scabrous. 1.5 cm to 8cm long petiole. Erect stems and yellow-orange corolla and dark red or purple base.

Seeds are brownish-black and oval shaped.

Distribution 
Abutilon pannosum is native to many countries in tropical and Horn of Africa, Yemen, Egypt, Saudi Arabia, India and Pakistan.

Utilisation 
Abutilon pannosum seed are used as a herbal laxative while its flower extracts are used for improving sexual performance.

References 

pannosum
Flora of the Indian subcontinent
Flora of Saudi Arabia
Flora of Cape Verde
Flora of West Tropical Africa